PMView is a raster graphics image viewer, converter, and organizer with basic image editing capabilities. It was originally developed for OS/2 but is also available for Microsoft Windows.

What it is and what it does
PMView reads and writes and converts between more than 40 image file formats, shows the images on the screen, single and in slide shows, rotates or mirrors them, changes sizes and color depth, crops parts out of the images, and provides global editing of the image, all this individually on the image displayed on the screen, by prerecorded macros called batch scripts on a range of images, or directly in the File Open Container. And it can, of course, also print the images.

PMView uses its own file open dialog, showing thumbnails of all images in a given folder in what PMview calls the "File Open Container", unless the user chooses to see only the filenames. The size of those thumbnails can be changed by the user, and the user can choose if the thumbnails are taken from the operating system, out of the JPEG or PNG files, or dynamically generated by PMView.  Still in the "File Open Container", all or selected images can be processed by file copy and move operations, conversion between file formats, application of various image editing tasks in batch operation macros.

PMView can acquire images by scanning of images using a TWAIN interface to an Image scanner, and by grabbing a part of the computer's screen by screenshots. And of course, from the clipboard, as a new image and as a new area of an existing image.

Image editing features are global color modifications regarding color balance, gamma correction,  luminance, negative conversion, solarization, sharpening and softening of edges, and a number of filters including Gaussian blur and user-defined filters.

For images with indexed color (2, 4, 16, or 256 colors), typical for GIF images and found in most PNG images, PMView can edit the palette of colors, thus modifying the color of individual spots within the image.

The Windows version runs on all Windows versions from  Windows 98 to Windows 8, including native 64 bit versions, the OS/2 version on OS/2 3 "Warp" and newer. The program is written in C++ with some routines in Assembler, making heavy use of multithreading, creating and destroying threads as needed, thus enabling PMView to be very fast.

History

PMView is short for Presentation Manager Viewer. The name dates back to 1992 and OS/2 version 1.x where the graphical shell for OS/2 was called Presentation Manager. An early OS/2 version of PMView was on the IBM BBS as "pmview86.zip, 231751, 11-30-93, PM Picture viewer. GIF/BMP/JPG/PCX/TGA". PMView version 1.00 was released in 1997. PMView version 1 was available in English, German, French, and Spanish. The last OS/2-only version of PMView as version 1.05.

PMView 2000 (aka PMView v2.00) was released in early 2000 for both Windows and OS/2. The last version of PMView 2000 is v2.32.

PMView Pro (aka PMView v3.00) was released in 2003.

Details

References

External links

 Reference Manual
 Getting Started manual
 Historical Peter Nielsen Interview
 Discussion of PMView on dpreview.com forum: "how do you view all your photos?"
Mentioning of PMview on dpreview.com forum "Best program to View your pictures"

Image organizers
Screenshot software